Eric of the Smallands may refer to:

 Eric, Duke of Swealand and the Smallands, prince 1251, son of Princess Ingeborg and Jarl Birger
 Eric XIV, King of Sweden 1560, also Duke of Eyland